The FLN initials may refer to:

Transportation
 FLN Frisia Luftverkehr, German airline
 Flint (Amtrak station), in Michigan
 Flint railway station, in Wales
 Hercílio Luz International Airport in Florianópolis, Brazil

Other
 Family Life Network, American radio network
 Fine Living Network, American television network
 FLN football team, defunct Algerian football team
 Filamin, class of proteins
 Flintshire (historic), historic county in Wales, Chapman code
 Florianópolis Air Force Base, in Brazil
 Freelancer.com, crowd-sourcing marketplace
 National Liberation Front (disambiguation)